Bukovec is a municipality and village in Plzeň-South District in the Plzeň Region of the Czech Republic. It has about 100 inhabitants.

History
The first written mention of Bukovec is from 1177.

From 1 January 2021, Bukovec is no longer a part of Domažlice District and belongs to Plzeň-South District.

References

Villages in Plzeň-South District